Mike Fasolo (born January 28, 1969) is an American writer best known for his work on the television show Robot Chicken.

Fasolo was born and raised in the small town of Tuxedo, New York. He graduated from Tuxedo High School and earned his BA in Literature from Ramapo College of New Jersey. Fasolo's first writing job was at a local paper, the Photo News, where his first story was published on the front page.

In 1994, Fasolo joined the staff of Wizard Magazine as the head of the Research Department where he was in charge of gathering information and illustrations for the magazine. After a few months at Wizard, Fasolo accepted a job in the Editorial Department of Wizard's sister magazine, InQuest, where he reported on games and collectibles. After six months, he moved back to Wizard as a copy editor and staff writer.

At Wizard, Fasolo became friends with Matt Senreich, the co-creator of Robot Chicken. In 2004, Cartoon Network picked up Robot Chicken and, at Senreich's request, Fasolo moved to California to be a writer on the show. He also serves as a voice actor and creative director for the show.

Fasolo is represented by the Gersh Agency.

Awards
2009: Annie Award, winner of Writing in a Television Production for "Robot Chicken: Star Wars Episode II"
2010: Emmy Award, winner of Outstanding Short-format Animated Program for Robot Chicken
2011: Annie Award, winner of Writing in a Television Production for "Robot Chicken: Star Wars Episode III"
2016: Emmy Award, winner of Outstanding Short-format Animated Program for Robot Chicken

References

External links 

 Robot Chicken page on AdultSwim.com

Living people
1969 births
American comedy writers
American television writers
Annie Award winners
American male television writers
People from Tuxedo, New York
Ramapo College alumni
Primetime Emmy Award winners
Screenwriters from New York (state)